The 1994 Bank of Ireland All-Ireland Senior Football Championship was the 108th staging of the All-Ireland Senior Football Championship, the Gaelic Athletic Association's premier inter-county Gaelic football tournament. The championship began on 15 May 1994 and ended on 18 September 1994.

Derry entered the championship as the defending champions, however, they were defeated by Down in the Ulster quarter-final in what is regarded as one of the greatest games of all time.

On 18 September 1994, Down won the championship following a 1–12 to 0–13 defeat of Dublin in the All-Ireland final. This was their fifth All-Ireland title and their first in three championship seasons.

Dublin's Charlie Redmond was the championship's top scorer. Down's Mickey Linden was the choice for Texaco Footballer of the Year.

Provincial championships

Connacht Senior Football Championship

Quarter-finals

Semi-finals

Final

Leinster Senior Football Championship

Preliminary round

Quarter-finals

Semi-finals

Final

Munster Senior Football Championship

Quarter-finals

Semi-finals

Final

Ulster Senior Football Championship

Preliminary round

Quarter-finals

Semi-finals

Final

All-Ireland Senior Football Championship

Semi-finals

Final

Championship statistics

Miscellaneous

 On 29 May 1994, the Leinster Preliminary round game between Westmeath and Louth was the first game played in Páirc Ciaran, Athlone for 70–80 years.
 Wexford beat Offaly for the first time since 1977.
 Leitrim qualified for the Connacht final for the first time since 1967. Their 0–12 to 2–4 defeat of Mayo gave them their first provincial title since 1927. It remains their only defeat of Mayo in a Connacht final and their last provincial decider victory.
 Down's All-Ireland final defeat of Dublin preserved their 100% record of victories in All-Ireland finals.
 There were a number of first-time championship meetings. Both All-Ireland semi-finals between Cork and Down and the later meeting of Dublin and Leitrim were first-time encounters.

Top scorers

Overall

Single game

References

External links
 "My Greatest Game: Down's two-time All-Ireland winner Mickey Linden". BBC Sport. 31 May 2020.